Ramblers Football Club was a 19th-century football club based in Glasgow.

History

The club was founded in 1874.  Its first recorded match was a 0–0 draw with Burnbank, and its first recorded goal and win came at Hamilton Academical F.C. the following month.

The Ramblers entered the Scottish Cup for the first time in 1875–76.  The club was drawn away to Northern F.C. and lost by 4 goals, plus one disputed goal, to nil.  The club entered the competition three times in total, losing in the first round on every occasion; 6–0 (plus one disputed) at 3rd Lanarkshire Rifle Volunteers in 1876–77, and 1–0 at home to Stonefield F.C. in 1877–78, in a "hard but pleasant game".

The last match advertised for the club was against Blythswood F.C. in December 1877, but there is no report that the match took place.  The final recorded match was a 2–0 defeat at Stonelaw F.C. the previous month, against a scratch side rather than the regular Stonelaw XI.

Colours

The club wore blue and black jerseys, white knickers, and blue and black hose.

Grounds

The club played originally at Queen's Park.  By 1876 the club had a private ground at Lorne Park, on Victoria Road, Crosshill, Glasgow.

References

Defunct football clubs in Scotland
Football clubs in Glasgow
Association football clubs established in 1874
Association football clubs disestablished in 1877
1874 establishments in Scotland
1877 disestablishments in Scotland